Ichnotropis  microlepidota is a species of African lizard in the family Lacertidae. It is commonly called Marx's rough-scaled lizard and is largely found in Angola, Africa.  I. microlepidota is a terrestrial lizard and was first discovered at the foot of Mount Moco.

Description
I. microlepidota is a medium-sized lizard with a slender body, long tail, and well developed legs.

Identification of Ichnotropis includes the following:
Cylindrical tail without lateral fringe
Toes without serrated or fringed edge
Smooth or tubular lamellae under toes 
Subocular scales bordering lip
No collar present
Keeled or overlapping dorsal scales
Head shields smooth or slightly rough

I. microlepidota is similar to Ichnotropis bivittata except I. microlepidota has a wider body.

Biology
I. microlepidota is insectivorous and feeds on termites and other small insects.  It is an active hunter during the day.

Taxonomy and evolution
Based on morphological evidence, the South African genus Ichnotropis and the North American genus Psammodromus diverged from the lineage of Lacerta lepida and Lacerta monticola during the Oligocene epoch (24 to 36 million years ago).

Predators
I. microlepidota has been recorded as prey of Melierax metabates, the chanting  goshawk, a bird of prey indigenous to Africa

References

Endemic fauna of Angola
Ichnotropis
Reptiles of South Africa
Reptiles of Angola
Reptiles described in 1956
Taxa named by Hymen Marx